The National Association of Black Journalists Hall of Fame is a hall of fame project of the National Association of Black Journalists (NABJ) honoring African-American and other journalists. The original Hall of Fame list was established on April 5, 1990, with the induction of seven individuals. No further individuals were inducted until the Hall of Fame was revived by the NABJ in 2004. Since 2004, several individuals have been inducted to the Hall of Fame each year. Nominations are approved by the NABJ Board of Directors, and new inductees are installed annually at the NABJ Hall of Fame Banquet and Inductions. Thirty-nine individuals are currently inductees in the Hall of Fame.

Members
1990 original inductees

Seven individuals were inducted to the Hall of Fame at the time of its creation.
Dorothy Butler Gilliam
Malvin Russell Goode
Mal Johnson
Gordon Parks
Ted Poston
Norma Quarles
Carl T. Rowan

2004 "legendary" inductees

In April 2004, the NABJ revived the Hall of Fame, and the Board of Directors (upon a "strong recommendation" from the NABJ Hall of Fame Screening Committee) voted to posthumously induct ten historical journalists (referred to on the NABJ's website as "legendary figures") as a one-time measure. The ten inductees were:
Robert S. Abbott
Samuel Cornish
Frederick Douglass
W. E. B. Du Bois
T. Thomas Fortune
Marcus Garvey
Ethel Payne
John B. Russwurm
John Sengstacke
Ida B. Wells-Barnett

2004 contemporary inductees 
John H. Johnson
Robert C. Maynard
Chuck Stone

2005 inductees 
Charles "Teenie" Harris
Charlayne Hunter-Gault 	
Max Robinson	
Carole Simpson

2006 inductees 
Lerone Bennett, Jr.
Albert Fitzpatrick	
William Raspberry

2007 inductees 
Xernona Clayton
Merv Aubespin	
John L. Dotson, Jr.	
Jim Vance

2008 inductees 
Charles E. Cobb, Jr.
Belva Davis
Vernon Jarrett (posthumous)
Les Payne

2009 inductees 
Earl Caldwell
Peggy Peterman (posthumous)
Lynn Norment
Larry Whiteside (posthumous)

2011 inductees 

 Ed Bradley (posthumous)
 Merri Dee
 JC Hayward
 Eugene Robinson
 Ray Taliaferro

2012 inductees 

 Gwen Ifill
 Pat Harvey
 Ruth Allen Ollison
 Johnathan Rodgers
 Wallace Terry

2013 inductees 

 Betty Bayé
 Simeon Booker
 Alice Dunnigan (posthumous)
 Sue Simmons
 Wendell Smith (posthumous)
 Cynthia Tucker

2014 inductees 

 Herb Boyd
 Maureen Bunyan
 Jay Harris
 Moses Newson
 Bernard Shaw
 Zelda Ormes (Posthumous)
 Ernest Dunbar (Posthumous)
 Lee Thornton (Posthumous)

2017 inductees 

 Michael Days
 John Jenkins
 Rev. Aisha Karimah
 Garth C. Reeves, Sr.

2018 inductees 

 Albert Dunmore
 Bob Ray Sanders
 Louis Martin
 Victoria Jones
 William Rhoden

2019 inductees 

 Bob Black
 Garry D. Howard
 “The Fly Jock” Tom Joyner
 Wanda Lloyd
 The Washington Post Metro Seven

2020 inductees 

 Fred Sweets
 Cathy Hughes
 Clarice Tinsley
 John McCaa
 Mary Mitchell
 Pam Oliver
 Pam Johnson

2021 inductees 

 Roland S. Martin
 Rodney A. Brooks
 Rochelle Riley
 Monica Roberts (posthoumous)
 Kirk McKoy
 Cornelius “Neil” Foote Jr (Neil Foote)
 Claire Smith
 A. J. Smitherman (posthumous)

Notes

External links
Official website

Lists of hall of fame inductees
Halls of fame in Maryland
Mass media museums in the United States
African-American press
 *
African-American organizations